UML may refer to:
 Unified Modeling Language, a software modeling language
 University of Massachusetts Lowell, a research university
 User-mode Linux, virtual machine software
 Communist Party of Nepal (Unified Marxist–Leninist), abbreviated CPN (UML)

See also
 Unified Medical Language System (UMLS), a medical informatics tool